A pantomath is a person who wants to know or knows everything. The word itself is not to be found in common  online English dictionaries, the OED, dictionaries of obscure words, or dictionaries of neologisms.

Logic dictates that there are no literal nonfictional pantomaths, but the word pantomath seems to have been used to imply a polymath in a superlative sense, a ne plus ultra ("nothing more beyond") as it were, one who satisfies requirements even stricter than those to be applied to the polymath. In theory, a pantomath is not to be confused with a polymath in its less strict sense, much less with the related but very different terms philomath and know-it-all.

Etymology 

A pantomath (pantomathēs, παντομαθής, meaning "having learnt all", from the Greek roots παντ- "all", "every" and the root μαθ-, meaning "learning", "understanding") is a person whose astonishingly wide interests and knowledge span the entire range of the arts and sciences.

Uses 
Pantomath is typically used to convey the sense that a great individual has achieved a pinnacle of learning, that an "automath" has taken autodidacticism to an endpoint. As an example, the obscure and rare term seems to have been applied to those with an astonishingly wide knowledge and interests by these two authors from different eras: Jonathan Miller has been called a pantomath, as has Rupert Hart-Davis.

See also 
Omniscience

Notes

External links 
 Excerpts from a discussion of the word at Wordsmith.org:
 Excerpt one
 Excerpt two

Referrer 
 Wikipedia

Knowledge
Greek words and phrases